Patrick Bateman is a fictional character created by novelist Bret Easton Ellis. He is the villain protagonist and narrator of Ellis' 1991 novel American Psycho and is portrayed by Christian Bale in the 2000 film adaptation. He is a wealthy and materialistic yuppie and Wall Street investment banker who, supposedly, leads a secret life as a serial killer. Bateman has also briefly appeared in other Ellis novels and their film and theatrical adaptations.

Biography and profile
Bateman, at the beginning of American Psycho, is a 27-year-old specialist in mergers and acquisitions at the fictional Wall Street investment firm of Pierce & Pierce (also Sherman McCoy's firm in The Bonfire of the Vanities) and lives at 55 West 81st Street, Upper West Side on the 11th floor of the American Gardens Building (where he is a neighbor of actor Tom Cruise). In his secret life, however, Bateman is a serial killer murdering a variety of people, including colleagues, the homeless, and prostitutes. His crimes—including rape, torture, necrophilia, and cannibalism—are graphically described in the novel.

Bateman comes from a wealthy family. His parents have a house on Long Island, and he mentions a summer house in Newport. His parents divorced sometime earlier, while his mother became sick and now resides at a sanatorium. His father, who first appeared in Ellis's preceding novel The Rules of Attraction, grew up on an estate in Connecticut, and now owns an apartment in the Carlyle Hotel in Manhattan.  He is assumed to be dead as he is mentioned only in the past tense during the novel. (In Mary Harron's 2000 adaptation, however, it is mentioned that Bateman's father "practically owns" the company that Patrick Bateman works at, implying that Bateman's father is still alive.) Bateman's younger brother Sean attends Camden College (and is a protagonist of Ellis's previous novel, The Rules of Attraction, in which Patrick Bateman was first introduced). Bateman attended Phillips Exeter Academy for prep school.  He graduated from Harvard College and Harvard Business School, and moved to New York City.

By the end of the novel, he believes he is about to be arrested for murdering a colleague named Paul Allen (Paul Owen in the novel) and leaves a message on his lawyer's answering machine confessing to his crimes. When he runs into his lawyer at a party, however, the man mistakes him for somebody else and tells him that the message must have been a joke, as he had met with Allen only days earlier. Bateman realizes that the punishment and notoriety he desires will be forever out of his reach, and that he is trapped inside a meaningless existence: "This is not an exit".

Personality

As written by Ellis, Bateman is the ultimate stereotype of yuppie greed; wealthy, conceited, and addicted to sex, drugs, and conspicuous consumption. All of his friends look alike to him, to the point that he often confuses one for another; they often confuse him for other people as well. Bateman delights in obsessively detailing virtually every single feature of his upper-class lifestyle, including designer clothes, workout routine, business cards, alcoholic drinks, elaborate high-end stereo and home theater sound system. He is engaged to an equally wealthy, shallow woman named Evelyn Williams. He has a mistress on the side named Courtney Lawrence, the girlfriend of Luis Carruthers, a closeted homosexual whom Bateman despises, and has regular liaisons with prostitutes and women he encounters at clubs, many of whom end up being his victims. The one woman (and possibly the one person) in his life for whom he has anything approaching feelings is his secretary, Jean. He feels that she is the only person in his life who is not completely shallow, so he cannot bring himself to seduce or kill her. He casually acknowledges her as "Jean, my secretary who is in love with me" and introduces her in the narration as someone whom he "will probably end up married to someday".

Despite his affluence and high social status, Bateman is plagued by feelings of anxiety and low self-esteem. He kills many of his victims because they make him feel inadequate, usually by having better taste than he does. He is hated by others as well—his friends mock him as the "boy next door"; his own lawyer refers to him as a "bloody ass-kisser... a brown-nosing goody-goody"; and he is often dismissed as "yuppie trash" by people outside his social circle.

Bateman often expresses doubts regarding his own sanity and he has periodic attacks of psychosis, during which he hallucinates. It is left open to interpretation whether Bateman actually commits the acts he describes, or whether he is merely hallucinating them; he is, therefore, an unreliable narrator. In the climax of the story, Bateman calls his lawyer and leaves a lengthy, detailed message confessing all of his crimes. He later runs into his lawyer, who mistakes him for someone else and dismisses the confession as a joke, also claiming to have had dinner with one of his victims after Bateman had supposedly killed him, leaving the supposed reality of Bateman's acts open to audience interpretation.

Although Bateman often claims that he is devoid of emotion, he also describes experiencing moments of extreme rage, panic or grief—being on the "verge of tears"—often over trivial inconveniences such as remembering to return videotapes or trying to obtain dinner reservations. In the middle of dismembering a victim, he breaks down, sobbing that he "just wants to be loved". He takes psychotropics, like Xanax, to control these emotions. He publicly espouses a philosophy of tolerance, equality, and "traditional moral values" because he thinks it will make him more likable, but is in fact virulently racist, homophobic, and anti-Semitic. Bateman compensates for his anxiety through obsessive vanity and personal grooming, with unwavering attention to detail. He buys the most fashionable, expensive clothing and accessories possible (e.g., Salvatore Ferragamo, Alan Flusser and Valentino suits, Oliver Peoples glasses and Jean Paul Gaultier, Louis Vuitton and Bottega Veneta leather goods) as a means of effecting some "control" over his otherwise chaotic life. Likewise, he categorizes people by what they wear and how they look because they are more easily "understood" in terms of labels and stereotypes. Bateman's apartment also is firmly controlled in terms of look and taste, with the latest music, food, and art.

Bateman kills more or less indiscriminately, with no preferred type of victim, somewhat targeting any woman and man who gets in his way, and no consistent or preferred method of killing. Throughout the novel, he kills men, women, animals, and, in one instance, a child. Bateman murders women mostly for sadistic sexual pleasure, often during or just after sex. He kills men because they upset or annoy him or make him feel inferior. In the case of the child, Bateman wished to see if he would enjoy it but found it unsatisfactory since the child's death would not affect as many people as an adult would. Periodically, he matter-of-factly confesses his crimes to his friends, co-workers, and even complete strangers ("I like to dissect girls, did you know I'm utterly insane") just to see if they are actually listening to him. They either are not, or they think that he is joking.

Outside American Psycho
Bateman made his first appearance in Ellis's 1987 novel The Rules of Attraction (in which Sean, his brother, is the protagonist); no indication is given that he is a serial killer. Bateman also makes a short appearance in Ellis's 1998 novel Glamorama, with "strange stains" on the lapel of his Armani suit.

Bateman also appeared in the American Psycho 2000 e-mails, which were written as an advertisement campaign for the movie. Although they are often mistakenly credited to Ellis, they were actually written by one or more unnamed authors and approved by Ellis before being sent out. American Psycho 2000 served as a sort of "e-sequel" to the original novel. The e-mails take place in 2000, a little over a decade since the novel. Bateman is in psychotherapy with Dr M. He is also married to Jean, his former secretary. They have a son, Patrick Bateman Jr. (P.B.), who is eight years old. In the story, Bateman talks about therapy, trying to get a divorce from Jean, his renewed feelings about murder, and idolizing his son. In the end, it is revealed that the 'real' Bateman, who 'writes' the e-mails, is the owner of the company that produces the movie.

Bateman appeared in Ellis's 2005 novel Lunar Park, in which the fictionalized Bret Easton Ellis confesses that writing American Psycho felt like channeling the words of a violent spirit rather than writing anything himself. This ghost—Bateman—haunts Ellis's home. A character also comes to Ellis's Halloween party dressed as Patrick Bateman, and a copycat killer is seemingly patterning himself on Bateman. Toward the novel's end, Ellis writes the 'last' Bateman story as a way of confronting and controlling the character, as well as the issues Ellis created Bateman as a means of countering.  Bateman, for all intents and purposes, dies in a fire on a boat dock.

In the Showtime series Dexter, protagonist Dexter Morgan, himself a serial killer, uses the alias "Dr. Patrick Bateman" to acquire M-99 for the use of incapacitating his victims.

There is a recurring character in the video game Criminal Case named Christian Bateman (a combination of the names Christian Bale and Patrick Bateman) modeled after the character.

American metalcore band Ice Nine Kills released a single titled "Hip To Be Scared" based upon the film adaptation for their album The Silver Scream 2: Welcome to Horrorwood.

In film, on stage and screen
Though Christian Bale had been the first choice for the part by both Ellis and Harron, the role amused him after his agent told him that the role would be a "professional suicide", the producers also offered the part to the likes of Keanu Reeves, Edward Norton, and Brad Pitt. Leonardo DiCaprio was set to play the character, but Ellis (as explained in the American Psycho DVD) decided he would appear too young, especially immediately after Titanic. In addition, his managers thought the role was "too violent" and could potentially hurt his career. Bateman was also portrayed by Dechen Thurman, a brother of Uma Thurman, in the 2000 documentary This Is Not an Exit: The Fictional World of Bret Easton Ellis. Michael Kremko played Bateman in the standalone sequel American Psycho 2, in which the character is killed by a would-be victim. Aside from the character appearing in the film, the sequel has no other connection to the previous film and has been denounced by Ellis.

Scenes with the character were shot for the 2002 film adaptation of The Rules of Attraction. Ellis revealed in an interview that director Roger Avary asked Bale to reprise the role, but Bale turned down the offer, and Avary asked Ellis himself to portray Bateman. Ellis refused, stating that he "thought it was such a terrible and gimmicky idea", and Avary eventually shot the scenes with Casper Van Dien. The scenes, however, were ultimately cut from the final version of the film.

In a 2009 interview with Black Book, director Mary Harron said, "We talked about how Martian-like [the character] Patrick Bateman was, how he was looking at the world like somebody from another planet, watching what people did and trying to work out the right way to behave, and then one day [Christian] called me and he had been watching Tom Cruise on David Letterman, and he just had this very intense friendliness with nothing behind the eyes, and he was really taken with this energy."

Doctor Who star Matt Smith played the role in the 2013 stage musical version of the novel, with music and lyrics by Duncan Sheik and a book by Roberto Aguirre-Sacasa, at London's Almeida Theatre. In 2016, Benjamin Walker portrayed Bateman in a Broadway production of the musical, which ran from March 21 – June 5, 2016.

In the television series Riverdale, Kevin Keller (portrayed by Casey Cott) performs in a musical production of American Psycho as Bateman in the sixth season episode "Chapter One Hundred and Twelve: American Psychos".

Chronology
23 October 1962: Patrick Bateman is born.
1980: Bateman graduates from Phillips Exeter Academy.
1984: Bateman graduates from Harvard University.
1985: Bateman has a short discussion with his estranged brother Sean about his future.
1986: Bateman graduates from Harvard Business School.
From the time of his graduation, through the end of American Psycho, Bateman works at Pierce & Pierce.
c. 1996: Bateman shows up at Victor's club in Glamorama with "strange stains" on his suit.
2000: Bateman enters therapy with a Dr M. This appears in the American Psycho 2000 e-mails. In these emails, he is divorcing Jean, to whom he has been married for at least five years, and with whom he has a son. He has started his own brokerage firm and seems to be wealthier than he was in the original novel. His tastes are even more refined. His homicidal tendencies (or thoughts) seem to have cooled a little with the birth of his son and have mellowed as he has gotten older, but have not disappeared completely.
2003: Ellis kills off Patrick Bateman by writing an account of the serial killer being trapped in a pier fire. See Lunar Park.

References 

American Psycho
Bret Easton Ellis characters
Characters in American novels of the 20th century
Fictional bankers
Fictional cannibals
Fictional characters with psychiatric disorders
Fictional cocaine users
Fictional criminals in films
Male film villains
Fictional Harvard University people
Fictional rapists
Fictional torturers
Fictional murderers of children
Fictional serial killers
Fictional nihilists
Narcissism in fiction
Fictional socialites
Fictional characters from Manhattan
Internet memes
Literary characters introduced in 1987
Male horror film villains
Male literary villains
Male characters in film
Male characters in literature